Fintelligens is a hip hop group from Helsinki, Finland. The band is formed of two MCs: Elastinen and Iso H. The band has released three albums and one compilation, all selling more than 150,000 copies.

Career
In the early 1990s the Finnish hip hop scene was dominated by more humorous acts, such as Raptori. For many years afterwards, Finnish hip hop was strongly seen as some kind of joke. When Fintelligens released their debut album Renesanssi in 2000, it was the first more serious mainstream record to emerge. Renesanssi was a success and went gold with hit singles Voittamaton, Kellareiden Kasvatit and a collaboration with Swedish MC's Petter and Peewee called Stockholm-Helsinki. The album started a boom in Finnish hip hop as record companies endeavored to sign their own rap artists.

In 2001 Fintelligens released the albums Tän Tahtiin and Kokemusten Summa in 2002, both creating hit singles and certified gold. Fintelligens also made the theme song to the 2003 Ice Hockey World Championships, titled Kaikki peliin. The song was a huge hit in Finland. In the same year they released a compilation album and both started to make solo albums.

Fintelligens were pioneers in creating a Finnish style of rap, and many other artists have been influenced by their style of rapping. Both Elastinen and Iso H produce beats also. Renesanssi included a couple of beats by both MCs, Tän tahtiin was mostly produced by Elastinen, and on Kokemusten Summa he provided all of the production. At the beginning of their careers, Elastinen and Iso H were heavily inspired by French hip hop.

The members of Fintelligens, together with Kapasiteettiyksikkö, are the founders of the Finnish independent hip hop record label Rähinä Records.

In 2008 Fintelligens released a new album titled "Lisää".

Discography

Albums

Compilation albums

Singles

References

Finnish hip hop groups